Hugh John MacDonald (April 11, 1911 – June 24, 1998) was a provincial level politician from Alberta, Canada. He served as a member of the Legislative Assembly of Alberta from 1948 to 1959.

Political career
MacDonald ran for a seat to the Legislative Assembly of Alberta for the first time in the 1948 Alberta general election. He ran as a Liberal candidate in the Calgary electoral district and won the fourth seat.

MacDonald ran for a second term in the 1952 Alberta general election. He won his second term in office taking the fifth seat in the vote. MacDonald ran for his third term and final term in office in the 1955 Alberta general election. He was re-elected improving his popularity to win the second seat. He would retire from the Legislature in 1959.

Macdonald later served as a justice with the Court of Queen's Bench.

References

External links
Legislative Assembly of Alberta Members Listing

Alberta Liberal Party MLAs
1911 births
1998 deaths